The Rainbow Minute is a serial radio show created and produced by Judd Proctor and Brian Burns. An article called The Rainbow Minute from the website Diversity Richmond describes Proctor's inspiration for the show, “In February of 2005, retired public school teacher Judd Proctor was out running errands, when he happened to tune in to “This Way Out,” a gay and lesbian international news magazine.”  He, alongside his partner Brian Burns, who is a former art director, began underwriting This Way Out and their first airing was on February 16, 2005 with a dedication to Harvey Milk. They then moved on to create their own radio broadcast in Virginia called The Rainbow Minute. The official website, WRIR.org, for The Rainbow Minute describes the show, “The Rainbow Minute is a radio show about gay and lesbian heroes, history and culture.” The two work as a team, with Judd doing the research and mixing, while Brian edits episodes and sets the music. Their first episode of The Rainbow Minute aired on September 25, 2006. It airs on WRIR in Richmond, Virginia and enjoys frequent airings on other radio stations across the United States. The Rainbow Minute documents the contributions and relationships of Lesbian and Gay people throughout history. Segments are read by a diverse group of volunteers. Those outside the Richmond, Virginia listening area can hear The Rainbow Minute at www.wrir.org every weekday at 7:59am, 12:29pm, and 4:59pm.

Diversity Richmond 
Diversity Richmond is a voice and support system for the LGBT community that was founded in 1999. Diversity Richmond sponsors The Rainbow Minute. Like The Rainbow Minute, the Diversity Richmond is an organization that works for the equality of the LGBT community and gives people the opportunity to feel comfortable when around LGBT people, become involved in working for LGBT equality, and also become educated about the hardships LGBT people face daily and how we can make a difference. They hold numerous classes and discussion groups including a women’s coming out support group. The Rainbow Minute and Diversity Richmond both hold volunteer opportunities. The Rainbow Minute allows volunteers to become a talk show hosts, all-nighter DJs, weekday board operators, for example. Diversity Richmond has volunteer opportunities like diversity bingo and diversity thrift to help raise money for their organization and to also get more people involved. Phylis Johnson, author of Radio Cultures: The Sound Medium in American Life, acknowledges that because of the Stonewall Rebellion, queer radio stations emerged across the United States with the help of volunteers (98). Volunteers make this organization and other radio station and media possible through their dedication and work.

History 
Previously, there weren’t many radio stations having to do with LGBT communities because not many people identified with being LGBT due to lack of knowledge as to what the term LGBT meant. The only terms people referred to were gay, lesbian, or straight. An article by Bonnie Morris describes the history of gay and lesbian people, "In the United States, few attempts to make advocacy groups supporting gay and lesbian relationships until after World War II, although prewar gay life flourished in urban centers such as Greenwich Village and Harlem during the Harlem Renaissance of the 1920s." Today, more and more radio stations and other forms of media are emerging that are geared specifically towards the LGBT community. Christopher Pullen and Margaret Cooper support this in their book "LGBT Identity and Online New Media" by describing the opportunities that online media give LGBT people to connect with each other, "Through online new media, LGBTs offer person expressions of self, in the construction of public identity." In an article called “Romeo in love: a community format in a community radio,” Tiziana Cavallo talks about the video cast Romeo in Love, which was created in 2008 by one heterosexual and one gay friend (281). Like The Rainbow Minute, it is a video cast about the lives of LGBT people. This video cast demonstrates the ways in which times have changed regarding associating with LGBT individuals and how people of different communities, such as heterosexual communities, racial communities, etc., are working together to create fairness and respect for everyone of the LGBT community. The Rainbow Minute and Diversity Richmond give people a place of comfort and safety that give them inspiration and hope for equality.

References

External links
Gay Community Center of Richmond - The Rainbow Minute

2006 radio programme debuts
American talk radio programs
LGBT-related radio programs
2000s LGBT-related mass media